The 1960 Gent–Wevelgem was the 22nd edition of the Gent–Wevelgem cycle race and was held on 17 April 1960. The race started in Ghent and finished in Wevelgem. The race was won by Frans Aerenhouts of the Mercier team.

General classification

References

Gent–Wevelgem
1960 in road cycling
1960 in Belgian sport
April 1960 sports events in Europe